Paterson is an unincorporated community in Benton County, Washington, United States, located on the northern banks of the Columbia River at the junction of Washington State Route 14 and Washington State Route 221.  It was named for early settler Henry Paterson.

Climate
According to the Köppen Climate Classification system, Paterson has a semi-arid climate, abbreviated "BSk" on climate maps.

References

Unincorporated communities in Benton County, Washington
Unincorporated communities in Washington (state)